Qian Hong (born 13 June 1976) was a former Chinese badminton player. She was part of the national team that clinched an Uber Cup in 1998 Hong Kong. In the individual events, she participated at the 1994 World Junior Championships clinched a gold medal in the mixed doubles event partnered with Zhang Wei, and a silver medal in the girls' doubles event with Wang Li. Teamed-up with Liu Lu, she won the women's doubles title at the 1996 Scottish Open, and 1997 Swedish Open. At the 1997 Asian Championships, she won two silver medals in the mixed and women's doubles event, and also settled for a bronze medal at the World Championships in the women's doubles event.

Achievements

BWF World Championships 
Women's doubles

Asian Championships 
Women's doubles

Mixed doubles

World Junior Championships 
Girls' doubles

Mixed doubles

IBF World Grand Prix 
The World Badminton Grand Prix sanctioned by International Badminton Federation (IBF) since 1983.

Women's doubles

IBF International 
Women's doubles

References

External links 
 

1976 births
Living people
Badminton players from Jiangsu
Chinese female badminton players